Thamina Kabir; born 10 May 1985 is a British-Bangladeshi lawyer known for representing a Muslim woman in a landmark UK civil case against her ex-husband and his parents for bride price. She was the first to represent Bangladesh at the Mrs. Universe pageant in 2013. She is also an author of a crime fiction novel, Hunting Hercules, published in July 2022.

Education 
Thamina completed her secondary and higher secondary education in Bangladesh. She stood 9th in the combined merit list in SSC and 6th in the combined merit list in HSC in Chittagong Division, Bangladesh. She was awarded  scholarships by the Ministry of Education, Bangladesh for her outstanding academic achievement on both occasions. 

With a view to studying law and becoming a barrister, she moved to the UK in 2003 at the age of 18. She graduated with a LLB (Hons) from University of Northumbria in 2008, followed by the Bar Vocational Course from City University in 2009. Kabir has a post graduate diploma in International Commercial Arbitration from Queen Mary University, London.

Career 
Kabir's legal career has focused on litigation and human rights. In 2011, she qualified as a solicitor. In 2015, she founded her own law firm Thamina Solicitors only at the age of  30. Kabir received particular public attention for her representation of Nazma Quraysha Brishty who took her ex-husband and his parents to court seeking full payment of mahr. It is a landmark UK court ruling in 'bride price' dispute. Until the decision of the court, the UK courts had dealt only with cases involving written mahr contracts. The case in question is the first that involved an alleged oral contract of mahr. 

She is a member of both the Chartered Institute of Arbitrators (CIArb) and Young International Arbitration Group -LCIA. She is also an advocate in Bangladesh.

Mrs Universe Bangladesh 2013 
Kabir first entered the limelight when she participated in Mrs. Universe 2013 and represented Bangladesh as the first Bangladeshi ever.  Mrs. Universe is an international and global beauty pageant and Human Rights Forum in one organised in Sofia City, Bulgaria in 2007. The contest is open to married women from countries/nations of all continents around the world who are between the ages of 25 and 45, have a family and career, and are involved in a "significant cause". The idea that unites married women from different countries is the motto "Against violence" which covers different causes in different years.

Awards and honours 
In 2013, Kabir has received 'Maa Amar maa' award in academic achievement category. She has also been recognised in the annual British Bangladeshi Who's Who in 2015.

Other notable works 
Kabir supports a number of charities. She is dedicated and committed to end violence against women, for good. Thamina was a co-opted governor of Barclay Primary School from 2013 to 2016. Barclay Primary is an academy, part of the Lion Academy Trust. She held the post of a vice chairman of the board of the governors in 2015. Kabir is the vice president of the governing body of The Society of British-Bangladeshi Solicitors.

Personal life 
Thamina was born in Chittagong, Bangladesh in 1985. She can speak Bengali (native), English, Urdu and Hindi (conversational).

Reference

1985 births
Living people
Alumni of Northumbria University
Bangladeshi beauty pageant winners
Bangladeshi emigrants to the United Kingdom
British women lawyers
English barristers
English solicitors
Members of Lincoln's Inn
People from Mirsharai Upazila